Olé Brasil Futebol Clube, usually known as Olé Brasil, is a currently inactive Brazilian football club based in Ribeirão Preto, a city in the state of São Paulo.

History
The club was founded on September 21, 2006 by entrepreneurs Eduardo Zanello, Fabrício Zanello, and Fernando Sólon. Olé Brasil Futebol Clube is the third club to be founded in Ribeirão Preto after Botafogo and Comercial.  The new club would debut in 2009 in Campeonato Paulista Segunda Divisão, equivalent to the fourth division of the state.

Competition records

Mascot

The club's mascot is a penguin, the symbol of the city. The mascot is called Picolé, and wears the club's home kit.

External links
Official Website
Club info

Inactive football clubs in Brazil
Association football clubs established in 2006
Football clubs in São Paulo (state)
2006 establishments in Brazil